The Macfarlane River is a river of the southwest of New Zealand's South Island. It flows south from the Southern Alps, joining with the Landsbourgh River (Westland District) just before the latter's outflow into the Haast River.

See also
List of rivers of New Zealand

References

Rivers of the West Coast, New Zealand
Westland District
Rivers of New Zealand